The following lists events that happened during 1993 in Lebanon.

Incumbents
President: Elias Hrawi  
Prime Minister: Rafic Hariri

Events
 July 25 - Operation Accountability: Israeli forces attack Lebanon at the beginning of a week-long campaign.

Births
 February 10 – Mia Khalifa, Lebanese American pornographic actress

References

 
Years of the 20th century in Lebanon
1990s in Lebanon
Lebanon
Lebanon